Colors Kannada Cinema is an Indian television movie channel, owned by Viacom 18, that primarily broadcasts Kannada language movies. The channel was launched on 24 September 2018, being the first reginal movie channel from Viacom 18.

References

Television stations in Bangalore
Kannada-language television channels
Television channels and stations established in 2018
Viacom 18
2018 establishments in Karnataka

Movie channels in India